Laraha (Citrus × aurantium subsp. currassuviencis), or Curaçao orange (Citrus aurantium var. currassuviencis), is the name of a citrus tree that grows on the island of Curaçao, and also the fruit of this tree.  The name is cognate with Portuguese laranja for the orange. A descendant of the orange, the fruit of the laraha is too bitter and too fibrous to be considered edible.

History and use
Seville orange trees transplanted on Curaçao from Spain in 1527 did not thrive in the arid climate and soil of this Southern Caribbean island. As the trees were then abandoned, the fruit evolved from a bright orange color into the green laraha. The dried peels of the laraha, however, were discovered to be pleasantly aromatic, and experimentation with the extracts of these peels led to the creation of Curaçao liqueur.

See also
Bitter orange

References

Citrus
Flora of Curaçao